China International Capital Corporation Limited (CICC; 中国国际金融股份有限公司) is a Chinese partially state-owned multinational investment management and financial services company. Founded in China in 1995, CICC provides investment banking, securities and investment management services to corporations, institutions and individuals worldwide.

As the first international joint-venture investment bank in China, CICC provides domestic, overseas, and cross-border financial services including investment banking, equities, FICC, asset management, private equity investment, wealth management and research.

Headquartered in Beijing, CICC has over 200 branches in Mainland China and offices in Hong Kong, Singapore, New York City, London, San Francisco, Frankfurt and Tokyo.

History
On July 31, 1995, CICC was incorporated by China Construction Bank, Morgan Stanley, China National Investment and Guaranty Co Ltd, GIC, and the Mingly Corporation, as the first Sino-foreign joint venture investment bank. At the time of CICC's incorporation, China Construction Bank and Morgan Stanley were its largest shareholders, with 42.5% and 35% of interests, respectively.

In 1997, CICC established its first overseas subsidiary in Hong Kong, through which CICC became the first Chinese investment bank conducting securities underwriting business in Hong Kong. In 1997, CICC completed its first overseas initial public offering project, the IPO of China Mobile on the Hong Kong Stock Exchange, which marked the beginning of the restructuring and overseas listing of large state-owned enterprises directly under the State Council of China. It was also the largest IPO in Asia as well as the largest IPO of China-based companies ever up until the end of 1997.

In 2004, China Construction Bank transferred its equity interest to China Jianyin Investment, which later transferred that to China Central Huijin, a wholly owned subsidiary of China Investment Corporation. In 2010, Morgan Stanley sold its holdings to TPG, KKR, GIC and Great Eastern. CICC established its FICC division, and was one of the earliest investment banks to conduct fixed income business in China.

In 2007, CICC set up its wealth management division, and was one of the earliest investment banks to engage in wealth management business in China.

In 2010, CICC became the first investment bank to obtain approval from the China Securities Regulatory Commission to raise and manage private equity funds.

In 2015, CICC was converted into a joint stock company with limited liability whose top three shareholders were Huijin, GIC and TPG. In November 2015, CICC completed its own IPO on the Hong Kong Stock Exchange.

In 2016 CICC acquired China Investment Securities from Central Huijin in an all-share deal.

In 2017, CICC acquired a majority stake (50+%) in US KraneShares, a leading exchange-traded fund provider that focuses on Chinese listed companies, with its biggest fund (KWEB) focused on Chinese Internet companies. 
In 2017, giant Chinese internet company, Tencent acquired a 5% stake in CICC.

In 2020, CICC became a listed company in China A-share market.

Divisions
CICC's major business segments: Investment Banking, Equities, Fixed Income, Private Equity, Asset Management, Wealth Management and Research.

Shareholding Structure
As of October 31, 2021, its shareholding structure was as follows:
40.17% Central Huijin Investment Ltd.
30.74% HKSCC Nominees Limited
8.26% Haier Group (Qingdao) Financial Holdings Ltd.
4.49% Alibaba Group Holding Limited
4.48% Tencent Holdings Limited
2.64% China National Investment and Guaranty Corporation
0.38% Hong Kong Securities Clearing Company Limited
0.32% China Reform Investment Co., Ltd.
0.32% China Structural Reform Fund Corporation Limited
0.29% Abu Dhabi Investment Authority
7.92% Other Public Shareholders (A+H shares)

Notable former employees
Wang Qishan – Vice President of the People's Republic of China
Wu Jinglian – Chinese economist
Xu Xiaonian – Professor of Economics and Finance at China Europe International Business School
Bei Duoguang – CEO of JPMorgan First Capital Securities
Ding Wei – Head of Temasek China
Fang Fenglei – Chairman of Goldman Sachs Gao Hua Securities, Chairman of Hopu Investments
Ha Jiming – Vice Chairman, China of Goldman Sachs Private Wealth Management
Jiang Guorong – Vice Chairman of UBS Asia
Jin Liqun – President of Asian Infrastructure Investment Bank
David X. Li – Chinese statistician
Marshall Nicholson – Hong Kong investment banker with BOC International and Nomura Holdings
Wu Shangzhi – Chairman and Managing Partner of CDH Investments
Levin Zhu – son of Zhu Rongji, a former Premier of the People's Republic of China

See also 
Economy of China
Chinese financial system
Banking in China
Securities industry in China

References

Further reading 

Investment management companies of China
Investment banks in China
H shares
Companies listed on the Hong Kong Stock Exchange
Government-owned companies of China
China Investment Corporation
Banks established in 1995
Financial services companies established in 1995
Chinese companies established in 1995
Companies based in Beijing
Chaoyang District, Beijing